The 2022 Greek Basketball Super Cup is the 3rd edition of the revived Greek professional domestic basketball super cup competition, under the auspices of the Hellenic Basketball Clubs Association (HEBA), and the 4th overall. The Greek Basketball Super Cup had been played only three times before, in 1986 under the auspices of the Hellenic Basketball Federation (E.O.K.), in 2020, and in 2021. All games were hosted in Kallithea Palais des Sports in Rhodes, Greece.

Olympiacos won the 2022 Greek Super Cup.

Format
The competition will be played in a final-four format and single elimination games, between the teams placed in the four first places of the 2021–22 Greek Basket League, which include the 2021–22 Greek Basketball Cup winner and finalist. Larisa basketball team finished fourth in the 2021–22 Greek Basket League earning the right to participate in the Super Cup final four competition, however, the club decided to forfeit the competition and Kolossos H Hotels replaced them.

Qualified Teams
The following four teams qualified for the tournament.

Bracket

References

External links
 Official Hellenic Basketball Federation Site 
 Official Greek Basket League Site 

Greek Basketball Super Cup
2022–23 in Greek basketball